Peter J. Sospenzo (born December 23, 1956) is an American professional stock car racing driver and crew chief who works for Spire Motorsports on their Next Gen car implementation. He previously competed in the NASCAR Busch Grand National Series as a driver.

Racing career
A former NASCAR Busch Series and ARCA Permatex SuperCar Series driver, Sospenzo began working as a crew chief in 1994 with Rich Bickle. From 1994 to 1997, he worked with Phil Parsons, Joe Ruttman, Lake Speed, Loy Allen Jr., Mike Wallace, and Gary Bradberry. He later joined Penske-Kranefuss Racing, taking over as Jeremy Mayfield's crew chief during the 1999 season after Paul Andrews was fired. In 2000, Sospenzo and Mayfield won two races, though the former was also subject to penalties during the year for various infractions. In May, he was fined following Mayfield's win at California Speedway for a roof height violation, followed by a four-race suspension for using illegal fuel additives during the Talladega Superspeedway race in April.

He joined Hendrick Motorsports' No. 25, driven by Joe Nemechek late in the 2002 season. The following year, the two won at Richmond International Speedway; Nemechek rebounded from a pit miscommunication that dropped him to 25th by taking the lead late in the race and was declared the winner when the event was shortened by rain. With the Hendrick organization, Sospenzo later worked with Brian Vickers and Terry Labonte. He reunited with Nemechek at Ginn Racing in 2007, but was released when the team merged with Dale Earnhardt, Inc. in July.

After Ginn, Sospenzo joined Michael Waltrip Racing and Michael McDowell's No. 00 car, which was followed by leading Kevin Conway and David Gilliland at Front Row Motorsports. In 2014, he became Dave Blaney's crew chief at Randy Humphrey Racing. A stint at Team Xtreme Racing in 2015 saw his final race as a Cup crew chief—the 2015 Daytona 500 with Reed Sorenson—until 2018.

In 2018, Sospenzo joined Premium Motorsports; in addition to overseeing the team's No. 7, he led Stefan Parsons' NASCAR Camping World Truck Series debut with the team at Bristol Motor Speedway. The following year, he became the crew chief of Spire Motorsports' No. 77. In July, he won the rain-shortened Coke Zero Sugar 400 at Daytona with driver Justin Haley. In addition to being Haley and Spire's first Cup victories, it was Sospenzo's first since the coincidentally also-rain-shortened 2003 Richmond victory with Nemechek.

In 2021, Sospenzo was replaced by Kevin Bellicourt as the crew chief of the Spire Motorsports No. 77 car, and he became the crew chief for Rick Ware Racing's No. 52 car driven by Josh Bilicki. After the first 10 races of the season, Sospenzo left RWR to return to Spire where he was tasked with helping the team prepare their Next Gen cars for 2022. He also served as the interim crew chief for the No. 77 at Sonoma and again at Bristol in September when Bellicourt was suspended.

Motorsports career results

NASCAR
(key) (Bold – Pole position awarded by qualifying time. Italics – Pole position earned by points standings or practice time. * – Most laps led.)

Busch Series

Busch North Series

ARCA Permatex SuperCar Series
(key) (Bold – Pole position awarded by qualifying time. Italics – Pole position earned by points standings or practice time. * – Most laps led.)

References

External links
 
 

1956 births
NASCAR drivers
NASCAR crew chiefs
ARCA Menards Series drivers
Living people
Sportspeople from Brooklyn
Racing drivers from New York City
Dale Earnhardt Inc. drivers